Truman Adams Merriman (September 5, 1839 – April 16, 1892) was an American lawyer,  Civil War veteran, and politician who served two terms as a U.S. Representative from New York from 1885 to 1889.

Biography

Early life and education 
He was born on September 5, 1839 in Auburn, New York. Merriman attended Auburn Academy, and in 1861 he graduated from Hobart College in Geneva, New York.

Civil War 
He entered the Union Army in September 1861 as a captain, commanding a company which he had raised as part of the 92nd New York Volunteer Infantry. He took part in several battles, including the Fair Oaks, Seven Days, and Petersburg.  He was wounded at Petersburg, and was mustered out as a lieutenant colonel in December, 1864.

Legal career 
He studied law with Charles J. Folger and was admitted to the bar in 1867.  He moved to New York City in 1871 and worked as a journalist for The Sun. He served as president of the New York Press Club in 1882, 1883, and 1884.

Congress 
Merriman was elected as an Independent (non-Tammany) Democrat to the Forty-ninth Congress and reelected as a Democrat to the Fiftieth Congress (March 4, 1885 – March 3, 1889). He was not a candidate for renomination in 1888.

Death and burial 
He died in New York City April 16, 1892, and was interred at Fort Hill Cemetery in Auburn.

References

1839 births
1892 deaths
Politicians from Auburn, New York
Hobart and William Smith Colleges alumni
Union Army officers
New York (state) Independents
Independent Democrat members of the United States House of Representatives
Democratic Party members of the United States House of Representatives from New York (state)
19th-century American politicians
Members of the United States House of Representatives from New York (state)